John Arthur Eyre (25 July 1885 — 12 June 1964) was an English cricketer who played first-class cricket for Derbyshire in 1908.

Eyre was born in North Wingfield, the son of Frederick Eyre, a coal miner. His father played a single game for Derbyshire in the 1892 season.

Eyre appeared in a single first-class fixture for Derbyshire in the 1908 season, against the Gentlemen of Philadelphia. Eyre was a right-handed middle-lower order batsman and scored one run in each innings.

Eyre died in Bolton-on-Dearne.

References

1885 births
1964 deaths
English cricketers
Derbyshire cricketers
People from North Wingfield
Cricketers from Derbyshire